Akhil Bhartiya JAT Mahasabha is an organization of Jats in India. The organization was created to raise awareness about the social and economic problems faced by Jats. The Jat Mahasabha spearheaded the community's struggle for reservation in the run-up to the Lok Sabha elections in 1999. Sardar Dara Singh was the president, followed by patron Ch Ajay Singh (Former High Commissioner to Fiji).

According to Nonica Datta, Jat Mahasabha was Arya Samaj's offshoot founded in 1905 in Muzaffarnagar. But Brij Kishore Sharma states that the claims of Datta are incorrect. According to him, it was founded in 1907, and that there are two claims regarding its place of formation. He notes that some sources support the Muzaffarnagar claim, but the Chhatri Jat journal states that it was founded at a fair in Garhmukteshwar, Uttar Pradesh.

The Mahasabha, a supra-provincial organization, was perceived in southeast Punjab as a symbol of unity in Jat society and as the main catalyst of reform and change. The Jat Mahasabha is a nonpolitical, social organization in nature. It is organized for the purpose of social reconstruction. Although the Jat Mahasabha has been functioning from 1993 for social causes, it is not a registered body, not even as an NGO or social organisation.

Sir Chhotu Ram was awarded the title of 'Rao Bahadur', and in 1923, he founded the Unionist Party or the 'Zamindar Association' to protect the interests of farmers.

Governor Malcolm Hailey addressed the Jat Mahasabha in 1930.

All India Jat Mahasabha recently appointed state President in Uttar Pradesh. Shubham Rathi Shubham Rathi is Youth state President Uttar Pradesh of Jat mahasabha.

See also 

 Khap
 Bhangi Misl of Dhillon Jats
 Misl concept of Punjab similar to khap system
 Sukerchakia Misl of Maharaja Ranjit Singh
 Dahiya Khap
 Jat Gazette
 Jat people
 Jat Regiment
 List of Jats
 World Jat Aryan Foundation
 Dev Samhita
 Jat reservation agitation
 20th Lancers
 10th Jats
 14th Murray's Jat Lancers
 9th Jat Regiment
 6th Jat Light Infantry

References 

https://en.m.wikipedia.org/wiki/Shubham_rathi

https://www.amarujala.com/amp/uttar-pradesh/shamli/jat-mahasabha-expanded-the-organization-shamli-news-mrt5757046192

 https://www.livehindustan.com/uttar-pradesh/moradabad/story-shubham-rathi-becomes-state-president-of-jat-mahasabha-3408348.amp.html

External links 
 http://jatmahasabha.org.in// Akhil Bhartiya JAT Mahasabha]

Jat
Ethnic organisations based in India